{{DISPLAYTITLE:Delta2 Gruis}}

Delta2 Gruis, Latinized from δ2 Gruis, is a solitary, red-hued star in the southern constellation of Grus. It is visible to the naked eye with an apparent visual magnitude of about 4. Based upon an annual parallax shift of 9.88 mas as seen from the Earth, the star is located around 330 light years from the Sun. It is moving further away from the Sun with a radial velocity of +3 km/s.

This is an evolved red giant star with a stellar classification of M4.5 IIIa. It is a pulsating variable with multiple periods, including 20.6, 24.1, 24.5, and 32.3 days. The strongest period is 33.3 days with an amplitude of 0.043 magnitude. It has a magnitude 9.71 visual companion at an angular separation of 60.4 arc seconds along a position angle of 210°, as of 2013.

References

M-type giants
Semiregular variable stars
Grus (constellation)
Gruis, Delta2
Durchmusterung objects
213080
111043
8560